This is a list of songs that reached number one on the Billboard magazine Streaming Songs chart in 2020.

Chart history

See also 
 2020 in American music
 List of Billboard Hot 100 number-one singles of 2020

References 

United States Streaming Songs
Streaming 2020